Norman Good Young (April 16, 1894 – October 24, 1984) was an American civil engineer who served as borough manager of Hollidaysburg, Pennsylvania and Phoenixville, Pennsylvania and Town Manager of Saugus, Massachusetts.

Early life
Young was born on April 16, 1894 in Hollidaysburg, Pennsylvania to Michael A. and Anna M. (Good) Young. He graduated from Phillips Andover Academy and the University of Pennsylvania (Class of 1922).

Career
Young was named borough manager of Hollidaysburg, Pennsylvania in 1922. On January 3, 1928 he was relieved of his duties after the borough council, in an effort to cut costs, voted to eliminate the position. In 1929 he was hired to work for the engineering department of DuPont. From 1930 to 1950 he was borough manager of Phoenixville, Pennsylvania. In 1950 he was appointed town manager of Saugus, Massachusetts. He was recommended for the position by Cambridge, Massachusetts City Manager John B. Atkinson. On January 30, 1952 Young resigned his position effect March 1 to become city engineer of Chester, Pennsylvania. At $9,000 a year, he was Chester's highest paid employee at the time of his hiring. He remained in this position until his retirement in 1967.

Later life and death
After his retirement, Young settled in Nokomis, Florida. He died on October 24, 1984 after a long illness.

References

1894 births
1984 deaths
American civil engineers
People from Hollidaysburg, Pennsylvania
People from Nokomis, Florida
Phillips Academy alumni
Town Managers of Saugus, Massachusetts
University of Pennsylvania alumni
Engineers from Pennsylvania
20th-century American engineers